The 1905 Kangra earthquake occurred in the Kangra Valley and the Kangra region of the Punjab Province (modern day Himachal Pradesh) in India on 4 April 1905. The earthquake measured 7.8 on the surface wave magnitude scale and killed more than 20,000 people. Apart from this, most buildings in the towns of Kangra, Mcleodganj and Dharamshala were destroyed.

Background
The calculated epicenter of the earthquake lies within the zone of thrusts along the front of the Himalayas formed by the continuing collision of the Indian plate into the Eurasian plate. Underthrusting of the Indian subcontinent beneath Tibet along a 2,500 km long convergent boundary known as the Main Himalayan Thrust has resulted in the uplifting of the overriding Eurasian Plate thus, creating the long mountain range parallel to the convergent zone.

Earthquake characteristics
The magnitude 7.8–7.9 earthquake struck the western Himalaya in the state of Himachal Pradesh at an estimated depth of 6 km along a very shallow dipping thrust fault, likely on the Main Himalayan Thrust detachment. The rupture area is calculated at 280 km × 80 km. The rupture did not reach the surface, therefore, is considered a blind thrust earthquake. A more recent study in 2005 estimated the rupture zone at 110 km × 55 km while still not breaking the surface.

Damage
The earthquake reached its peak Rossi–Forel intensity of X in Kangra. About 150 km away from this zone to the southeast, an area of increased intensity reaching VIII was recorded. This unusually high intensity away from the earthquake in the Indo-Gangetic Plain included the cities Dehradun and Saharanpur. It was felt VII in towns like Kasauli, Bilaspur, Chamba, and Lahore.

As many as 100,000 buildings were reported to have been demolished by the earthquake. At least 20,000 people are estimated to have been killed and 53,000 domestic animals were also lost. There was also major damage to the network of hillside aqueducts that fed water to the affected area. The total cost of recovering from the effects of the earthquake was calculated at 2.9 million (1905) rupees.

See also
 1897 Assam earthquake
 List of earthquakes in 1905
 List of earthquakes in India

References

Further reading

 Srivastava, H. N., Mithila Verma, and B. K. Bansal. "Seismological Constraints for the 1905 Kangra Earthquake and Associated Hazard in Northwest India." Current Science 99, no. 11 (2010): 1549–559. http://www.jstor.org/stable/24069452.

External links

1905 Kangra
Kangra Earthquake, 1905
Kangra district
History of Himachal Pradesh
Disasters in Himachal Pradesh
1905 earthquakes
April 1905 events
Buried rupture earthquakes
1905 disasters in India